Hybomitra montana, the  slender-horned horsefly, is a species of horse flies in the family Tabanidae.

Description
The body is black, the hairy abdomen is yellow with black stripes and the wings are brownish but transparent. The compound eyes are well developed in both sexes. They have bright blue-green eyes, with transversal red bands.

Adult horse flies can be found in July and August. Males of this species feed on plant juices, while female are bloodsuckers. The females have a high fecundity. They can lay about 500 eggs at an oviposition. The larvae pass through 10–13 instars and the full life-cycle lasts 3–5 years. This horsefly may cause appreciable damages on stock farms.

Distribution
This species can be found in most of Europe and in the eastern Palearctic realm.

Habitat
These horseflies live in various open landscapes, from mountains to peatlands and salt marshes.

References

 R G Soboleva - Biology of the gadfly Hybomitra montana montana Mg. (Diptera, Tabanidae) in the southern Far East

External links
 Funet
Martin C. Harvey , 2018 Key to genus Hybomitra

Tabanidae
Diptera of Asia
Diptera of Europe
Taxa named by Johann Wilhelm Meigen
Insects described in 1820